A polo tournament was contested at the 1924 Summer Olympics in Paris. The competition ran from 28 June to 12 July at the Château de Bagatelle and the Saint-Cloud Racecourse, with five teams competing. Argentina won the gold medal, beating all four of the other nations in the country's Olympic polo debut. Silver went to the United States, which played in—and won—the first three games of the tournament before a close-played (6–5) loss to Argentina in game 6. Great Britain, the two-time defending champions, finished with bronze.

Background

This was the fourth time that polo was played at the Olympics; the sport had previously appeared in 1900, 1908, and 1920 and would appear again in 1936. Each time, the tournament was for men only.

Argentina and the United States were favored; the two teams were recognized as the top two polo nations in the world but had never faced each other before.

Argentina made its debut in polo in 1924. Great Britain made its fourth appearance; it was the only nation to compete in all five editions of the Olympic polo tournament. The United States made its third appearance, while France and Spain each made their second.

Competition format

For the first time, the polo tournament used a round-robin format. Each nation played each other nation once.

Results

Rosters

 Argentina
 Arturo Kenny
 Juan Miles
 Guillermo Naylor
 Juan Nelson
 Enrique Padilla

 France
 Pierre de Chapelle
 Hubert de Monbrison
 Charles de Polignac
 Jules Macaire
 Jean Pastré

 Great Britain
 Frederick W. Barrett
 Dennis Bingham
 Fred Guest
 Kinnear Wise

 Spain
 Álvaro de Figueroa
 Count of Velayos
 Hernando Fitz-James
 Leopoldo Saínz de la Maza
 Justo San Miguel
 Rafael Fernández, 2nd Duke of Santo Mauro

 United States
 Elmer Boeseke
 Tommy Hitchcock, Jr.
 Fred Roe
 Rodman Wanamaker

References

 
 
 

1924 Summer Olympics events
1924
Men's events at the 1924 Summer Olympics